Ananthu vs Nusrath is a 2018 Indian Kannada-language romantic comedy film written and directed by Sudheer Shanbhogue. Produced under the banner Manikya Productions, the film tells the love story between a lawyer and a judge. The film stars Vinay Rajkumar as Ananthu, a lawyer and Latha Hegde, a judge in the titular roles. The supporting cast includes P. Ravishankar, Guruprasad, Suchendra Prasad, B. Suresha, Naveen D. Padil among others. The film's score and soundtrack is composed by Sunaad Gowtham and cinematography is by Abhishek G. Kasargod.

The film released across Karnataka on 28 December 2018 and this marks the last release for the year in Kannada cinema.

Synopsis 
Anantha Krishna Kramadarithaya is a lawyer from an orthodox Brahmin family . Nusrath Fathima Beig is the judge from a Muslim family. The plot revolves around how the love blossoms in the heart of duo in spite of their different cultural background .

Cast 
 Vinay Rajkumar as Anantha Krishna Kramadharittaya / Ananthu
 Latha Hegde as Nusrath Fathima Baig / Nusrath
 Prajwal Devaraj as Nisar Ahmed extend cameo 
 P. Ravishankar as Gavilingaswamy Kethamaranahalli
 B. Suresha as Shankara Narayana Kramdharittaya
 Guruprasad as G.P.
 S. K. Bhagavan as Senior advocate Bhagavan Guest appearance 
 Suchendra Prasad as Raikar
 Naveen D. Padil as advocate Aithal
 H. G. Dattatreya as Zulfikar Ali Khan
 Harini Srikanth as Vathsala
 K. P. Sridhar as Asadulla Baig
 Ashvithi Shetty as Uma Maheswari
 Vishwa Vijeth Gowda as Tyagaraja
 Nayana as Santana Lakshmi 
 Ashwin Hassan as Manjunath
 Sandeep as Aniketh

Soundtrack

Sunaad Gowtham has scored the soundtrack and score for the film. A total of six songs and one theme track were composed by him. The lyrics for the two songs are adapted from the poetry of the renowned poets Kuvempu and Amir Khusrow The audio is released on 1 November 2018 and is owned by actor Puneeth Rajkumar's PRK Audio label.

References

External links 
 
  Ananthu V/S Nusrath (2018)

2018 romantic comedy films
2018 films
2010s Kannada-language films
Indian romantic comedy films
Indian courtroom films
Films shot in Karnataka
Indian interfaith romance films